Northpark Copse to Snapelands Copse is a  biological Site of Special Scientific Interest north of Midhurst in West Sussex.

This site is important mainly because of its mosses and liverworts, which are relicts of a period 5000 years ago when the British climate was milder and wetter. There are old stools of Chestnut coppice which have six species of the moss genus Dicranum and liverworts include Bazzania trilobata, Marsupella emarginata and Kurzia sylvatica.

References

Sites of Special Scientific Interest in West Sussex
Forests and woodlands of West Sussex